This is a list of radio stations in Serbia (as of May 2010).

National coverage

City of Belgrade
This is a list of radio stations in Belgrade. There are 17 radio stations in Belgrade.

See also

 List of radio stations in Kosovo

Communications in Serbia
Serbia